Laurel Hill is a census-designated place and unincorporated community in Scotland County, North Carolina, United States. It is located northwest of Laurinburg, and southeast of Old Hundred, a neighboring community.

History 
In 1797 the Laurel Hill Presbyterian Church was established. The church was named for the laurel growing in the area. A community formed in the vicinity of the church, and after the American Revolutionary War it prospered as a center of commerce. Most of the initial settlers were Scottish Highlanders. A post office was established by 1822. A line of the Wilmington, Charlotte and Rutherford Railroad was later laid and a depot established to the south of the church area, and by 1861 most of the community had migrated there. A turpentine distillery and tub manufacturer were established. Federal troops under William Tecumseh Sherman camped by the church in 1865 during the Carolinas campaign of the American Civil War. In the 1870s John F. McNair created a general store in Laurel Hill. In 1900 Z.V. Pate purchased McNair's general store and transformed it into a large regional furniture retailer. Beginning in 2004, the community has hosted an annual festival, LaurelFest. In 2020 the local community center was demolished and the Scotland County Commission contracted construction of a new one the following year.

References

Works cited 
 
 
 

Census-designated places in Scotland County, North Carolina
Unincorporated communities in North Carolina